National Geographic Maps, founded in 1915, is the commercial map publishing division of National Geographic, part of a joint venture between The Walt Disney Company and the National Geographic Society. Initially the in-house cartographic studio for National Geographic magazine, National Geographic Maps is now responsible for the creation and distribution of commercial map products including printed wall maps and folded travel and outdoor recreation maps, and digital versions of its printed maps that are licensed for use in other products and publications. 
 Other divisions and groups within National Geographic Partners and National Geographic Society also create and distribute maps in their publications, including the National Geographic Magazine and Books divisions, but not within the commercial map publishing industry. Within The Walt Disney Company, National Geographic Maps is a division and imprint of Disney Publishing Worldwide, the publishing subsidiary of Disney Parks, Experiences and Products.
National Geographic Maps is based in Evergreen, Colorado, where it has maintained business offices, a map warehouse, and a cartographic studio since National Geographic acquired the Trails Illustrated trail map brand and assets in January 1997. Prior to that it was based in Washington, D.C. and its suburbs.

References

 Maps section of National Geographic website - https://www.nationalgeographic.com/maps
 National Geographic Has Digitized Its Collection of 6,000+ Vintage Maps: See a Curated Selection of Maps Published Between 1888 and Today - https://www.openculture.com/2018/05/national-geographic-has-digitized-its-collection-of-6000-vintage-maps.html
 Exploring National Geographic Maps - https://www.leventhalmap.org/articles/exploring-national-geographic-maps/
 National Geographic Maps - https://oshermaps.org/exhibitions/stately-cartography/section-5

External links
Official website
NationalGeographic.com - National Geographic's main website
Maps section of NationalGeographic.com
National Geographic Partners
National Geographic Society
Maps